Meshchansky District is a district of Central Administrative Okrug of the federal city of Moscow, Russia. Population:  

The district extends due north from Kitai-gorod to Kamer-Kollezhsky Val. Western boundary with Tverskoy District follows the track of Neglinnaya River (Neglinnaya Street, Tsvetnoy Boulevard, Samotechnaya Street, Soviet Army Street). Eastern boundary with Krasnoselsky District follows Bolshaya Lubyanka Street and Sretenka Street, then one block east from Mira Avenue. The Lubyanka Building lies in the Meshchansky District.

The district contains part of Kuznetsky Most Street, Rozhdestvensky monastery and  Rozhdestvensky Boulevard, Olympic Stadium and a row of neoclassical, palace-like buildings north from the Garden Ring. It houses headquarters of Federal Security Service in Lubyanka Square, Central Bank of the Russian Federation, FAPSI and other government agencies as well as the Sretensky Monastery and the Sretensky Theological Academy.

Etymology

Meshchane in the Russian Empire denoted a social estate of poor town residents who did not qualify as merchants or civil servants; in modern Russian, it is a pejorative name for a narrow-minded philistine. Meschansky District acquired its name earlier, in the second half of 17th century, through the Ukrainians and Belarusians abducted from their hometowns in the course of Russo-Polish War (1654–1667). These people settled north from present-day Garden Ring, reaching 692 households by 1682 (Sytin, p. 296). In their languages, meshchane meant simply "town people", "the locals", without negative connotation; the name of Meshchanskaya sloboda persists to date.

Symbols on the coat of arms denote:
Golden horn of plenty - the Central Bank
Red bridge - Kuznetsky Most
The cannon - old Moscow Armoury (пушечный двор) in present-day Pushechnaya Street

Gallery
North from Garden Ring: four historical buildings in a row are divided between Meshchansky and Maryina Roshcha District

References

Notes

Sources
П. В. Сытин, "Из истории московских улиц", М. 1948
City law on district boundaries, current version 
Year of Dostoyevsky's monument referenced to: "Архитектура РСФСР за XXX лет", М, 1949

External links
Official website of Meshchansky District 

 
Central Administrative Okrug
Districts of Moscow